The 21st National Geographic Bee was held in Washington, D.C. on May 20, 2009, sponsored by the National Geographic Society. The winner was Eric Yang of Griffin Middle School in The Colony, Texas, who won a $25,000 college scholarship, lifetime membership in the National Geographic Society and a trip to the Galápagos Islands with National Geographic Bee moderator and Jeopardy! host Alex Trebek. The 2nd-place winner was Arjun Kandaswamy of Meadow Park Middle School in Beaverton, Oregon. The 3rd-place winner was Shantan Krovvidi of Ligon Middle School in Raleigh, North Carolina.

2009 state champions

References

External links
 National Geographic Bee Official Website

National Geographic Bee